The following is a list of campuses with chapters and colonies currently recognized by the Zeta Beta Tau national fraternity.
 University of Alabama – Psi chapter
 American University – Beta Psi chapter
 Arizona State University – Gamma Tau chapter
 University of Arizona – Alpha Omicron chapter
 City of Boston – Gamma Psi chapter
 Brandeis University – Epsilon Phi chapter 
 Brooklyn College – Beta Xi chapter
 Cal Poly, San Luis Obispo – Eta Mu chapter
 California State University, Long Beach – Beta Pi chapter
 California State University, Los Angeles – Gamma Nu chapter
 California State University, Northridge – Gamma Beta chapter
 University of California at Berkeley – Alpha Eta colony
 University of California at Los Angeles – Alpha Rho chapter
 University of California at Santa Barbara – Gamma Xi chapter
 Case Western Reserve University – Lambda chapter
 University of Central Florida – Delta Iota chapter
 University of Colorado at Boulder – Beta Alpha Theta chapter
 College of Charleston – Eta Phi chapter
 Columbia University – Delta chapter
 University of Connecticut – Delta Beta chapter
 Cornell University – Kappa chapter
 University of Delaware – Epsilon Theta chapter
 University of Denver – Iota chapter
 Elon University – Eta Sigma chapter
 Emory University – Eta Lambda colony
 Fairleigh Dickinson University-Florham – Epsilon Tau chapter
 Fairleigh Dickinson University-Metro – Delta Pi chapter
 University of Florida – Alpha Zeta chapter
 Florida International University – Eta Rho chapter
 Franklin & Marshall College – Alpha Tau chapter
 Gannon University – Zeta Xi chapter
 Georgia Institute of Technology – Xi chapter
 The George Washington University – Phi Alpha Alpha chapter
 University of Illinois – Rho chapter
 Indiana University – Beta Gamma chapter
 The University of Iowa – Eta Tau chapter
 University of Kansas – Epsilon Mu chapter
 University of Kentucky – Alpha Iota colony
 Lynn University – Delta Eta chapter
 Lyon College – Phi Theta Gamma chapter
 University of Maryland, College Park – Beta Zeta Epsilon chapter
 University of Massachusetts Amherst – Theta Alpha chapter
 Massachusetts Institute of Technology – Xi chapter
 University of Memphis – Gamma Mu chapter
 University of Miami – Alpha Omega colony 
 Michigan State University – Beta Epsilon colony
 University of Missouri – Omega chapter
 Monmouth College – Delta Lambda chapter
 Muhlenberg College – Alpha Nu chapter
 New York University – Gamma chapter
 University of North Carolina at Chapel Hill – Alpha Pi chapter
 University of North Carolina at Charlotte – Eta Xi chapter
 University of North Florida – UNF colony
 Northeastern University – Gamma Psi chapter
 Northwestern University – Gamma chapter
 Ohio State University – Nu chapter
 Pace University – Delta Zeta chapter
 University of Pennsylvania – Theta chapter
 Pennsylvania State University – Alpha Psi chapter
 University of Pittsburgh – Beta Phi chapter
 Purdue University – Alpha Alpha chapter
 Quinnipiac University – Eta Omicron chapter
 Ramapo College – Zeta Delta chapter
 University of Rhode Island – Rho Iota chapter
 Rutgers University – Beta Delta chapter
 San Diego State University – Beta Lambda chapter
 Santa Clara University – Eta Upsilon chapter
 University of South Florida – Gamma Chi chapter
 University of Southern California – Alpha Delta chapter
 State University of New York at Albany – Epsilon Gamma chapter
 State University of New York at Binghamton – Epsilon Delta chapter
 State University of New York at Oneonta – Epsilon Nu chapter
 State University of New York at Plattsburgh – Eta Iota colony
 Syracuse University – Omicron chapter
 University of Tampa – Delta Omicron chapter
 University of Texas at Austin – Lambda chapter
 Towson University – Eta Kappa chapter
 Tufts University – Omicron chapter
 Tulane University – Sigma chapter
 Vanderbilt University – Alpha Gamma chapter
 Virginia Commonwealth University – VCU colony
Virginia Tech – Delta Xi chapter
 University of Washington – Alpha Mu chapter
 Washington University in St. Louis – Alpha Xi chapter
 Western Connecticut State University – Zeta Theta chapter
 University of Western Ontario – Zeta Eta chapter
 University of Wisconsin–Madison – Alpha Kappa chapter
 York College of Pennsylvania – Beta Alpha Chi chapter

Lists of chapters of United States student societies by society
chapters